Tom Pappalardo (born 1973) is an Easthampton, Massachusetts graphic designer, author, illustrator, and musician. He designed the Easthampton mural in the Easthampton, Massachusetts Cottage Street Cultural District, dedicated in June, 2008. Pappalardo and R. Sturgis Cunningham perform as the guitar-drum duo The Demographic. He has published an illustrated novel, a collection of comics, and an illustrated collection of essays. His 1996 comic "Alec Dear" (illustrated by Matt Smith) received a Xeric grant.

Bibliography
 Alec Dear (comic, writer, 1996)
 Through The Wood, Beneath the Moon (comic, writer, 1998)
 Failure, Incompetence (comic, 2005)
 Famous Fighters (comic with Matt Smith, 2005)
 Even Lions Will Fear You: Two Years of Whiskey! Tango! Foxtrot! (comic, 2009)
 OPT10 (comic, 2010)
 OPT11 (comic, 2011)
 Everything You Didn't Ask For (comic collection, 2014)
 One More Cup Of Coffee (2016)
 Broken Lines  (2018)
 Mind The Gap (chapbook, 2019)
 Bygone (chapbook, 2019)
 Satellites: Nine Stories (short story collection, 2022)

Discography
 Basement Make-Out Party (1999, The No-Shadow Kick)
 The Promo EP (2001, The No-Shadow Kick)
 Spatializing Sound In The Time Domain (2005, The No-Shadow Kick)
 Verse Chorus Curse (2011, The Demographic)
 Listen Close (2013, The Demographic)
 HIATUS (2021, The Demographic)
 I HATE US (2021 EP, The Demographic)

See also
 List of American comic creators

References

External links
 Official Homepage
 Standard Design design portfolio
 The Optimist comic strip
 The Demographic guitar/drum duo

1973 births
American comics artists
American cartoonists
Living people
American graphic designers
Guitarists from Massachusetts
21st-century American guitarists